Egypt sent a delegation to compete at the 2008 Summer Paralympics in Beijing, China.   The 38 member strong team won 12 medals, 4 gold, 4 silver and 4 bronze.  Sports Egypt participated in included athletics, powerlifting and table tennis Among Egypt's representatives included Fatma Omar and Sherif Othman in powerlifting, Mohammed Beshta, Mahmoud El-Attar, Hossam Abdel Kader and Mohammed El-Sayed Abdel Kader in athletics and Fayza Hafez in table tennis.

Medallists

Sports

Athletics

Men's track

Men's field

Powerlifting

Men

Women

Table tennis

Men

Women

Volleyball

The men's volleyball team didn't win any medals; they were defeated by Russia in the bronze medal match.

Players
Ashrad Zaghloul Abd Alla
Abd Elaal Mohamed Abd Elaal
Rezek Abd Ellatif
Abdel Nabi Hassan Abdel Latif
Mohamed Abouelyazeid
Taher Adel Elabahaey
Hesham Salah Elshwikh
Mohamed Abd Elhamed Emara
Salah Atta Hassanein
Hossam Massoud Massoud
El Saad Mossa
Ahmed Soliman

Tournament

Semifinal

Bronze medal match

See also
Egypt at the Paralympics
Egypt at the 2008 Summer Olympics

External links
International Paralympic Committee

References 

Nations at the 2008 Summer Paralympics
2008
Summer Paralympics